Bound Brook is a New Jersey Transit railroad station on the Raritan Valley Line, in Bound Brook, New Jersey.  The station building on the north side of the tracks is now a restaurant; the other station building on the south side is now privately owned.  A pedestrian tunnel connects the south and north sides of the tracks.

The Norfolk Southern Railway's Lehigh Line, the railroad's main freight line into the New York City area – built and formerly owned by the Lehigh Valley Railroad until merged into Conrail – is a few yards south of the south platform and is used by around 25 freight trains a day. The Lehigh Valley Railroad used a separate station to the south.

History 
The station at 350 East Main Street was opened on August 10, 1913 as a replacement station. This was a part of the Central Railroad of New Jersey Elevation Project from Elizabeth to Somerville (grade crossing removal). The station on the north side of the tracks replaced the original station (circa 1847-1848) that was located on the south side of the tracks as built by the Elizabethtown and Somerville Railroad.

Bound Brook station was listed on the New Jersey Register of Historic Places and the  National Register of Historic Places in 1984 as part of the Operating Passenger Railroad Stations Thematic Resource.

Station layout
The station has two low-level side platforms serving three tracks. The southernmost track and platform are not served by passenger trains.

Bibliography

References

External links
 

world.nycsubway.org - NJT Raritan Line
 Station from Google Maps Street View

NJ Transit Rail Operations stations
Former Central Railroad of New Jersey stations
Former Baltimore and Ohio Railroad stations
Bound Brook, New Jersey
Railway stations in Somerset County, New Jersey
National Register of Historic Places in Somerset County, New Jersey
New Jersey Register of Historic Places
Neoclassical architecture in New Jersey
Railway stations in the United States opened in 1840
Railway stations on the National Register of Historic Places in New Jersey
1840 establishments in New Jersey
Former SEPTA Regional Rail stations